Tunna, also Dunna or Atuna,  was an ancient Anatolian city. In classical antiquity Tunna was known as Tynna. Today it is known as Porsuk Hüyük or Zeyve Höyük.

Bronze Age 

In Bronze Age, Tunna or Dunna was a city under Hittite rule. The major deity of Tunna was the goddess Ḫallara. Additionally, the storm god with the epitheton piḫaššašši was also venerated at Tunna.

Iron Age 

In Iron Age, the city of Tunna was part of a city state called Atuna by the Assyrians. It is sometimes doubted Atuna really is identical with Tunna or if it lay far more north, right south of the Halys river. Doubtlessly, Atuna lay within the region called Tabal by the Assyrians, not to confuse with the state of Tabal which itself was located in the Tabal region and gave its name to the larger region. Three kings of Tunna are known: Ušḫitti, Ashwis(i), and Kurti.

Ušḫitti 

Ušḫitti was a king of Tunna ruling ca. 740 BC. He is only known from Assyrian sources. Ušḫitti of Tunna was tributary to the Assyrian king Tiglath-Pileser III in 738 and 732 BC.

Ashwis(i) 

Ashwisi is only mentioned in the Hieroglyphic Luwian inscription of Bohça, naming him the father of the succeeding king of Tunna, Kurti. It is not known if Ashwis(i) himself was king. However, based on the inscription of his son Kurti he can be dated to the 3rd quarter of the 8th century BC. Ashwis(i) may or may not be identical with Ušḫitti mentioned in Assyrian sources.

Kurti 

Kurti was a king of Tunna mentioned in both Hieroglyphic Luwian and Assyrian sources. He ruled from 732 or at least 718 to 713 BC.

In 718 BC, the territory of Tunna was enlarged. The Assyrian king Sargon II gave the Neo-Hittite state of Šinuḫtu to Kurti of Atuna after deporting Kiyakiya (Assyrian Kiakki), the king of Šinuḫtu, who withheld tribute from the Assyrians and conspired with king Mita of Muški (Midas of Phrygia).

In 713 BC, Kurti himself conspired with Mita of Muški but confronted with the fate of Ambaris, king of Tabal, who conspired with Urartu and Muški and therefore was deported to Assyria by Sargon II, Kurti changed sides to Assyria again.

Kurti himself left a Hieroglyphic Luwian inscription in Bohça. The inscription informs about Kurti's hunting success and how he was favored by the storm god Tarḫunza and by the stag god Runtiya, who gave territories and wild animals to him. The inscription of Bohça may or may not have been used as a mark of Kurti's hunting territory.

In 2017, Zsolt Simon argued that the
Luwian name Kurti (Kurtis) reflects the name Gordios, and that this name was borrowed from Phrygian language into the Luwian, and not the other way around, as proposed by other scholars. So Kurti may have belonged to the Phrygian ethnicity.

Literature 

 Piotr Taracha: Religions of Second Millennium Anatolia. Harrassowitz, Wiesbaden 2009. 
 Trevor Bryce: The World of the Neo-Hittite Kingdoms: A Political and Military History. Oxford University Press: Oxford, New York 2012. 
 Christian Marek, Peter Frei: Geschichte Kleinasiens in der Antike. Verlag C.H.Beck, Munich 2010. 
 Annick Payne: Iron Age Hieroglyphic Luwian Inscriptions. Society of Biblical Literature, Atlanta 2012. 
 Gwendolyn Leick: Who's Who in the Ancient Near East. Routledge, London 1999, 2002.

References 

Hittite cities
Syro-Hittite states